Amina Khalil (born 26 October 1988) is an Egyptian film and television actress who has gained prominence in the late 2010s and early 2020s in the Arab world.

Early life
Khalil studied acting at The American University in Cairo and graduated in 2009. She then studied at the Lee Strasberg Theatre and Film Institute in New York City. She studied ballet from childhood to age 17.

Career
Her roles in the films Asham (2012), Khetta Badeela (2015) and Sukkar Mor (2015) were critically acclaimed. Her breakout role in the 2016 television show Grand Hotel (also known as Secret of the Nile), and the 2018 TV series Layalie Eugenie (Eugenie Nights),  are both on Netflix. She has had roles in Taraf Tallet, Sharbat Loze, Nekdeb Law Olna Mabenhebesh, Saheb El Saada and Wallei El Ahd.

She cites Marion Cotillard as her acting inspiration, and says she would like to play a lead in an action movie that is "Lara Croft style, or like Jennifer Lawrence in The Hunger Games". She has sung with Egyptian hip hop artist Zap Tharwat.

Personal life
In July 2020, she became engaged to Egyptian businessman and engineer Omar Taha. Her hobbies include kitesurfing and swimming.

In October 2020, Khalil contracted COVID-19 and has since recovered.

She is an active proponent of women and their health in Egypt, and in June 2021 was named an honorary goodwill ambassador by the United Nations Population Fund.

See also
 Cinema of Egypt
 Top 100 Egyptian films
 List of Egyptian films of 2010s

References

External links
Official Instagram page
Amina Khalil at IMDb

1988 births
Living people
Egyptian film actresses
Egyptian television actresses
Actresses from Cairo
21st-century Egyptian actresses
Egyptian women's rights activists
Lee Strasberg Theatre and Film Institute alumni